All I Ever Need Is You is the fourth studio album by American pop duo Sonny & Cher, released in 1972 by Kapp/MCA Records. The album reached number 14 on the Billboard 200 and was certified gold for the sales of 500,000 copies.

Album information
The album was released in the beginning of 1972, debuting on the Billboard 200 at #96 on the issue date of February 26 and it peaked at #14 on April 29.

The title track was a top ten hit, reaching #7 on the US Hot 100 chart, and a #1 on the Adult Contemporary chart. The next single, "A Cowboy's Work Is Never Done" also became a top ten hit, reaching #8 on the US Hot 100. Its top 40 follow-up single, "When You Say Love", was not taken from this LP but its B-side "Crystal Clear/Muddy Waters" was.

The album is largely a collection of cover songs including "More Today Than Yesterday" (originally by The Spiral Starecase) and "United We Stand". The only song performed by Bono solo was "You Better Sit Down Kids", which was previously a top ten solo hit by Cher.

Track listing

Side A
 "All I Ever Need Is You" (Jimmy Holiday, Eddie Reeves) - 2:38
 "Here Comes That Rainy Day Feeling Again" (Roger Cook, Roger Greenaway, Tony Macaulay) - 2:33
 "More Today Than Yesterday" (Pat Upton) - 2:30
 "Crystal Clear/Muddy Waters" (Linda Laurie) - 2:39
 "United We Stand" (Tony Hiller, Peter Simons) - 2:35

Side B 
 "A Cowboy's Work Is Never Done" (Sonny Bono) - 3:14
 "I Love What You Did With The Love I Gave You" (Linda Laurie, Annette Tucker) - 2:20
 "You Better Sit Down Kids" (Sonny Bono) - 3:16
 "We'll Watch The Sun Coming Up (Shining Down On Our Love)" (Austin Roberts, Christopher Welch) - 2:29
 "Somebody" (Sonny Bono) - 3:07

Charts and certifications

Weekly charts

Certifications and sales

Credits

Personnel 
 Main vocals: Cher
 Main vocals: Sonny Bono
 Arranger: Al Capps

Production 
 Producer: Snuff Garrett
 Producer: Denis Pregnolato

References 

1972 albums
Sonny & Cher albums
Albums produced by Snuff Garrett
MCA Records albums